Armenia competed at the 2022 World Aquatics Championships in Budapest, Hungary from 17 June to 3 July.

Diving

Armenia entered two divers.

Men

Women

Swimming

Armenia entered two swimmers.

Men

Women

References

Nations at the 2022 World Aquatics Championships
2022 in Armenian sport
Armenia at the World Aquatics Championships